Auderghem (former Dutch spelling, now used in French; pronounced ) or Oudergem is one of the 19 municipalities of the Brussels-Capital Region (Belgium).

Located to the southeast of the region, along the Woluwe valley and at the entrance to the Sonian Forest (French: ,), the municipality has an environmental advantage. Despite large roads slicing through and the increasing traffic, it has been able to preserve a relatively important part of its natural and historic legacy: the creeks, the Red Cloister Abbey and its art centre, the Priory of Val-Duchesse, the Château of Three Fountains (French: ,), the Château of Saint Anne, and the remarkable Chapel of Saint Anne.

Auderghem is adjacent to the municipalities of Etterbeek, Ixelles, Woluwe-Saint-Pierre, and Watermael-Boitsfort. In common with all of Brussels’ municipalities, it is legally bilingual (French–Dutch).

The municipality is governed by its 16th mayor, Didier Gosuin (FDF).

History 
Three forest villages (Auderghem, Watermael, and Boitsfort-Bosvoorde), were one for centuries. In 1794, the soldiers of the French Revolution decided to separate these into three distinct municipalities. In 1811, Napoleon decided to reunite the three villages, by imperial decree, into a single administrative entity. But Auderghem was withdrawn from this union by royal act, leaving Watermael-Boitsfort on its own. Thus, Auderghem became an independent municipality in 1863, with only 1,600 inhabitants.

With the construction of the rail line linking Brussels and Tervuren as well as, in 1910, the construction of /, modernisation came to the municipality and the population grew quickly.

In 1956, Paul Henri Spaak lead the Intergovernmental Conference on the Common Market and Euratom at the Château of Val-Duchesse in Auderghem, which prepared the Treaties of Rome in 1957 and the foundation of the European Economic Community and Euratom in 1958.

Demographics
As of 2004 the majority of Brussels' Japanese expatriate population lives in Auderghem.

Sights
The Priory of Val-Duchesse, a gift of the Belgian King, is rarely open to the public. In 1963, Belgium's cabinet ministers met there, planting the seeds of a federalisation of the country though at conditions fiercely criticised especially in some extremist Flemish nationalist circles.

Similarly, the Chapel of Saint Anne, whose origins go back to the 12th century, is not open to the public. Decommissioned in 1843, it was sold several times. Its splendid sculptures from the Middle Ages and notable period furniture are still there to admire.

The municipality offers many green spaces.

Notable inhabitants
Léon Huygens, painter (1876–1918)
Odette De Wynter (1927 – 1998), the first women to be a notary in Belgium.

Education
Public secondary schools from the French Community of Belgium:
 Athénée Royal d'Auderghem

Subsidised religious secondary schools:
 Centre scolaire St-Adrien Val Duchesse
 Institut St-Julien Parnasse
 Ecole Sainte-Bernadette
 Institut Dominique Pire

Subsidised non-religious secondary schools:
 De l'autre côté de l'école

Private international schools:
The Japanese School of Brussels

See also

Municipalities of the Brussels-Capital Region

References

External links

Official site of the Municipality of Auderghem (in French)
Official site of the Municipality of Oudergem (in Dutch)

 
Municipalities of the Brussels-Capital Region
Populated places in Belgium